Ninnian Joseph Yule (30 April 1892 – 30 March 1950) was a Scottish-American burlesque and vaudeville actor who later appeared in many films as a character actor. He starred alongside Renie Riano in the Jiggs and Maggie film series. Yule was the father of actor Mickey Rooney.

Biography
Ninnian Joseph Yule was born in the Hutchesontown district of Glasgow on 30 April 1892, the son of Elizabeth (née McKell; 1866–1919) and boiler maker Ninnian Yule (1866–1943). He emigrated to the United States with his parents on the steamship Bolivia, arriving at the Port of New York on 2 August 1892. They settled in Brooklyn. As a teenager, Yule performed in local vaudeville theatres and was later booked into leading burlesque wheels, including the Columbia Burlesque Wheel, where he adopted the stage name Joe Yule.

In 1919, Yule married fellow vaudevillian Nellie W. Carter, a native of Kansas City, Missouri. In 1920, while they were appearing together in a Brooklyn production of A Gaiety Girl, their son Ninnian Joseph Yule Jr. was born. He later became a Hollywood actor under the name Mickey Rooney. The Yules separated in 1924 during a slump in vaudeville, and Carter moved with her son to Hollywood in 1925. Yule was naturalized as a U.S. citizen in Los Angeles on 14 May 1943.

Yule died of a heart attack on 30 March 1950 in Hollywood, California. He was 57. Rooney arranged to have his father buried near Rooney's friend and longtime acting colleague, Wallace Beery, who had died the year before. He wrote, "I thought it was fitting that these two comedians should rest in peace, side by side."

Filmography

The Great Ziegfeld (1936) as World's Fair Barker (uncredited)
Idiot's Delight (1939) as Vaudeville Comic (uncredited)
Sudden Money (1939) as Joe
They All Come Out (1939) as County Jail Inmate (uncredited)
Fast and Furious (1939) as One of the Actors (uncredited)
The Secret of Dr. Kildare (1939) as Lunch Room Counterman (uncredited)
Judge Hardy and Son (1939) as Munk, the Tire Man (uncredited)
Broadway Melody of 1940 (1940) as Dan (uncredited)
Forty Little Mothers (1940) as Counterman at Diner (uncredited)
Florian (1940) as Barker (uncredited)
Phantom Raiders (1940) as Sailor on Blown Up Ship (uncredited)
New Moon (1940) as Maurice
Boom Town (1940) as Ed Murphy
Strike Up the Band (1940) as Ticket Seller at Fair (uncredited)
Dulcy (1940) as Attendant at Resort Dock (uncredited)
Third Finger, Left Hand (1940) as Waiter (uncredited)
Gallant Sons (1940) as Mike, Who Whistles the Tune (uncredited)
Go West (1940)  as Joe, the Crystal Palace Bartender (uncredited)
Maisie Was a Lady (1941) as First Carnival Barker (uncredited)
The Wild Man of Borneo (1941) as Jerry (scenes deleted)
Come Live With Me (1941) as Sleepy Neighbor (uncredited)
Blonde Inspiration (1941) as Street Cleaner (uncredited)
The Trial of Mary Dugan (1941) as Sign Painter (uncredited)
I'll Wait for You (1941) as Little 'Butch'
Billy the Kid (1941) as Milton
The Get-Away (1941) as McMannis, a Bartender (uncredited)
Sucker List (1941, Short) as Man Wanting Match (uncredited)
Married Bachelor (1941) as Waiter (scenes deleted)
Shadow of the Thin Man (1941) as Henry, the Racetrack Watchman (uncredited)
Kathleen (1941) as Sign Poster
Babes on Broadway (1941) as Mason, Aide to Reed (uncredited)
Nazi Agent (1942) as Barney (uncredited)
Woman of the Year (1942) as Building Superintendent (uncredited)
Born to Sing (1942) as Ed Collera
Fingers at the Window (1942) as Citizen (uncredited)
Grand Central Murder (1942) as Stagehand (uncredited)
Maisie Gets Her Man (1942) as Elevator Operator (uncredited)
Jackass Mail (1942) as Barky
Calling Dr. Gillespie (1942) as Passerby in Detroit (uncredited)
The Omaha Trail (1942) as Ericson (uncredited)
Panama Hattie (1942) as Waiter (uncredited)
Mighty Lak a Goat (1942, Short) as Matinee Movie Patron (uncredited)
For Me and My Gal (1942) as Fred (uncredited)
Famous Boners (1942, Short) as George O'Flanagan (uncredited)
Harrigan's Kid (1943) as Jones (uncredited)
Air Raid Wardens (1943) as Air Raid Warden Recruit (uncredited)
Presenting Lily Mars (1943) as Mike, Stage Doorman (uncredited)
A Stranger in Town (1943) as Barber (uncredited)
Three Hearts for Julia (1943) as Taxicab Driver (uncredited)
Swing Shift Maisie (1943) as Clarence, Ice Cream Vendor (uncredited)
I Dood It (1943) as Theatre Doorman (uncredited)
Lost Angel (1943) as Tenant (uncredited)
Radio Bugs (1944, Short) as Dental Patient (uncredited)
Two Girls and a Sailor (1944) as The Carpenter (uncredited)
Meet the People (1944) as Shorty (uncredited)
Bathing Beauty (1944) as Bartender (uncredited)
The Seventh Cross (1944) as Prisoner at Concentration Camp (uncredited)
Kismet (1944) as Bath House Attendant (uncredited)
The Thin Man Goes Home (1944) as Barber (uncredited)
Nothing But Trouble (1944) as Police Officer (uncredited)
The Picture of Dorian Gray (1945) as Stage Manager (uncredited)
Murder in the Music Hall (1946) as Joe, Stage Doorman (uncredited)
Bringing Up Father (1946) as Jiggs
The Mighty McGurk (1946) as Immigrant from Ireland (uncredited)
That's My Gal (1947) as Comic (uncredited)
Magic Town (1947) as Radio Comic in Montage (uncredited)
Jiggs and Maggie in Society (1947) as Jiggs
Jiggs and Maggie in Court (1948) as Jiggs
Jiggs and Maggie in Jackpot Jitters (1949) as Jiggs
Jiggs and Maggie Out West (1950) as Jiggs (final film role)

References

External links
 
 
 

1892 births
1950 deaths
American male film actors
Male actors from Glasgow
British emigrants to the United States
Vaudeville performers
Burials at Forest Lawn Memorial Park (Glendale)
20th-century American male actors